is a passenger railway station located in Nishi-ku, Sakai, Osaka, Japan, operated by the private railway operator Nankai Electric Railway. It has the station number "NK15".

Lines

Layout
The station consists of an island platform for Wakayamashi and Kansai Airport serving two tracks, and a side platform for Namba serving two tracks which Track 4 was used for the trains returning at this station to Namba.The station building was rebuilt by Kingo Tatsuno in 1907 and is a Registered Tangible Cultural Property.

Platforms

Adjacent stations

History
It was rebuilt and renamed to its present name on 20 August 1907

Passenger statistics
In fiscal 2019, the station was used by an average of 4274 passengers daily.

Connections
Hankai Tramway Hankai Line (HN31: Hamadera-ekimae Station, for Abikomichi, Ebisucho and Tennoji-ekimae) - 150 m west from Hamaderakōen Station

Surrounding area
Hamadera Park
Fukueido
Hamadera Central Hospital

See also
 List of railway stations in Japan

References

External links

  
 Sakai city 

Railway stations in Japan opened in 1897
Railway stations in Osaka Prefecture
Registered Tangible Cultural Properties
Sakai, Osaka